Rajendra Choudhary (born 25 August 1955) is a politician in Rajasthan, Haryana, Delhi and other Jat dominating state in North India. 
Choudhary has served as Member of the Rajasthan Legislative Assembly and has held several state government portfolios and different ministries:
Urban Development, 
Housing & Transport, 
Devasthan department, 
Industry, 
Energy and non-conventional resource of energy, 
State lottery, 
Small saving & state insurance, 
Revenue & Land Department., 
Technical education, 
Information & public relations, 
Motor garage, 
Agriculture & ground water board, 
Medical & health
Labour, Employment and Factory & Boiler

Post held in Rajasthan Legislative Assembly
1985-90, 1993-98 & 2003                                    Member of Eighth(1985–90), Tenth(1993–98) and Eleventh (1998-2003)  Legislative Assembly
1985-87				         Member- Estimate Committee
1987-88				         Member- Public Account Committee
1994-96				         Member- Legislative Subordinate Committee
1996-98				         Member- Public Account Committee

Post held in Rajasthan State Government 
Feb. 1988 – June 1989                         State Minister- Local self(Independent Charge), Urban Development, Housing & Transport.
June 1989- Dec.1989                            State Minister- Devasthan 7 Waqf(Independent Charge), Industry, Energy and non Conventional Resource of Energy 
Dec. 1989 – March 1990	            State Minister- State Lottery, Small Saving & State Insurance(Independent Charge), Revenue & Land Dept.
Dec. 1998- March 1999 	            State Minister- Technical Education, Information & Public Relation, Motor Garage (Independent Charge), Agriculture & Ground Water Board
March 1999- March 2000	            State Minister- Technical Education, Medical& Health (Independent Charge), Agriculture & Ground Water Board
March 2000- May 2002	            State Minister- Medical Health & Family Welfare (Independent Charge), Agriculture & Ground Water Board
May 2002- Dec 2003   	            State Minister- Labour & Employment (Independent Charge)

Assignment by AICC And others 
1985-88 				     Member Syndicate, jai Narayan Vyas University, Jodhpur
1991-92		             Honorary Director, National Textile Co-operation(Punjab, Raj., Delhi )
2002				             AICC Observer- Saharanpur, Bijnore & Muzajjar Nagar in UP
				            Assembly Election
May 2002			             AICC Observer- Bhav Nagar in Gujarat Assembly Election
March 2007 			             AICC Observer- Bijnore in UP Assembly Election
June 2007	    	    	             AICC Observer- Punjab in Presidential Election
May 2011        			     AICC Observer- Dehradhun in Uttrakhand Assembly Election
2014        			             Vice President - Rajasthan Pradesh Congress Committee Jaipur.

Post held in  organisation 
 2014                                  Vice President - Rajasthan Pradesh Congress Committee Jaipur. 
1978 					Executive member: District Congress Committee, Jodhpur(Raj.)
1980					President: District Youth Congress Committee, Jodhpur(Nagaur)
1983					Co-coordinator, Kisan coordinator committee ( Jodhpur, Nagaur)
1984					Organizing Secretary Rajasthan Pradesh Youth Congress Committee, Jodhpur(Raj.)                                                                        
1985					Joint Secretary Rajasthan Pradesh Youth Congress  
1992 					General Secretary Rajasthan Pradesh Youth Congress
1996					General Secretary Rajasthan Pradesh Youth Congress
2000					Member: All India Congress Committee New Delhi
2006					Member: All India Congress Committee New Delhi

References

External links 

http://indiatoday.intoday.in/story/bjp-opponents-gun-for-jaswant-singh/1/282381.html

https://web.archive.org/web/20131019115951/http://rajassembly.nic.in/partyposition.htm
http://www.thehindu.com/todays-paper/tp-national/tp-otherstates/temple-tragedy-goofup-may-cost/article1387513.ece

Living people
1955 births
People from Jodhpur
Rajasthani politicians
Indian National Congress politicians
Rajasthan MLAs 1985–1990
Rajasthan MLAs 1993–1998
Rajasthan MLAs 1998–2003